The 1989 Irish Professional Championship was a professional invitational snooker tournament, which took place between 14 and 17 February 1989 at the Antrim Forum in Antrim, Northern Ireland.

Alex Higgins won the title beating Jack McLaughlin 9–7 in the final.

Main draw

References

Irish Professional Championship
Irish Professional Championship
Irish Professional Championship
Irish Professional Championship